Sydere Lake is a lake in geographic Sydere Township in Unorganized North Cochrane District, Cochrane District, in Northeastern Ontario, Canada. It is in the James Bay drainage basin and is the source of Sydere Creek.

The primary outflow, at the north, is Sydere Creek, which flows via the Poplar Rapids River, the Mattagami River and the Moose River to James Bay.

See also
List of lakes in Ontario

References

Lakes of Cochrane District